Leeper Park is a historic public park and national historic district located at South Bend, St. Joseph County, Indiana.  The district encompasses four contributing buildings, nine contributing structures, and one contributing object in a public park.  It was designed by landscape architect George Kessler, who issued the master plan for the park in 1915. Later improvements to the park were made by the Works Progress Administration in the 1930s.

Leeper Park is named for David R. Leeper who was elected Mayor of South Bend in 1892.

It was listed on the National Register of Historic Places in 2000.

References

Parks in Indiana
Works Progress Administration in Indiana
Historic districts on the National Register of Historic Places in Indiana
Historic districts in South Bend, Indiana
National Register of Historic Places in St. Joseph County, Indiana
Parks on the National Register of Historic Places in Indiana